Kostas Karamanlis served as a Prime Minister of Greece for two consecutive terms. During his incumbency, the period 2004-2009, he formed two cabinets. The first Karamanlis Cabinet succeeded the Panhellenic Socialist Movement (PASOK) cabinet of Costas Simitis after the 2004 elections, and was followed by Karamanlis' Second Cabinet after the 2007 elections.

The Cabinet
After his party's victory in the 2004 election, the new cabinet of Kostas Karamanlis was sworn in on 10 March.

In February 2006, Karamanlis announced his first major cabinet reshuffle.

See also 
 List of cabinets of Greece

Karamanlis, Kostas 1
Cabinets established in 2004
Cabinets disestablished in 2007
2004 establishments in Greece
2007 disestablishments in Greece
2004 in Greece
2005 in Greece
2006 in Greece
2007 in Greece
2004 in Greek politics
2005 in Greek politics
2007 in Greek politics
New Democracy (Greece)